A continental tire or a continental kit is an upright externally-mounted spare tire located behind an automobile's trunk, made popular by the Continental Mark Series, which carried a simulated continental tire until 1998. 

The term also describes a non-functional bulge stamped into the trunk lid or a cosmetic accessory to the rear of the car giving the impression of a spare tire mount.

Early spare tire mounts

The pre-mounted spare tire and wheel combination on early automobiles typically meant an external mounting because motorists would often need to change tires. Automakers often mounted a spare tire, or two, on the rear of the car. 

Some cars featured side-mounted spare tires in the fenders behind the front wheels. Automakers also offered side-mounted spare tires as an option. Early European sports cars had their spare tire attached to the back of the automobile since their trunk or storage space was often minimal. 

These rear or side mounted spare tires were not described as continental tire. 

The development of the enclosed trunk on automobiles meant the spare tire could be placed out of sight. This arrangement used up valuable space for carrying luggage. Manufacturers offered the sidemount option to increase trunk capacity. Some sports cars accommodated the spare tires inside the trunk resulting in a tight fit and it even projected a portion of the tire into the passenger area necessitating a vinyl cover.

The continental tire mount

Edsel Ford had a special car built after returning from a trip to Europe that would have a "continental look" – including a spare tire mounted on the trunk. The 1939 Lincoln Continental's short trunk with its external rear spare tire mount became a distinctive design. While this was not the first car to either carry its spare above the rear bumper or integrated it into the rear bodywork, it was the first to do it so elegantly and thus this feature became known as a "continental tire" even if the design was found on other brands.

Similar external spare tire placements were added as standard or optional to popular mass-market and also described as a "continental kit", borrowing their name from the production Lincoln Continental. Consumers were also able to have aftermarket "continental kits" installed on almost any vehicle.

There is a legend that Henry Ford II complained that the trunk of his personal Ford Thunderbird did not have room for a set of golf clubs without removing the spare tire. The 1956 Thunderbird had its spare tire mounted outside. However, adding weight behind the rear wheels was said to adversely affect steering and handling. For 1957 the Thunderbird's trunk was stretched  to allow the spare tire to migrate back inside, although the continental mounting was still optional. This external spare wheel mount became a customizing aftermarket appearance accessory during the 1950s.

In the United States, the external continental tire mounting was a factory option on various types of cars during the 1950s and early 1960s. On some smaller models – such as on the Nash Metropolitan and Jeepster Commando – the continental tire was a standard feature. The two-passenger Nash Metropolitan's rear-mounted spare tire was more convenient because access to the trunk was by folding down the seatback on the early (1954 through 1958) models. The large-sized 1957 Mercury Turnpike Cruiser was the top-of-the-line model and included what Ford described a "Dream Car Spare Tire Carrier" among its many standard features. 

The car's rear bumper was often extended and the tire had a fabric or metal cover. The bracket for the spare wheel was designed to swing away for access to the trunk. Manufacturers included continental tire mounts for their perceived "distinctiveness" as well as a means to increase luggage space in the trunk, such as on all the 1954 Nash Custom models.

The Jeep DJ was available in a "Surrey Gala" appearance package from 1959 until 1964. Included was a fringed top, seats, and a continental tire mount with a colorful vinyl-coated fabric covers in "candy stripes" of pink, green, or blue to match the car's body colors.

Simulated continental tire

Automotive historians also use this term to describe a nonfunctional circular bulge stamped into the trunk lid to give the impression of a spare tire. 

This design feature was popularized by several 1950s Italian-bodied Chrysler concept cars. The trunk lid bulge was later embraced by Chrysler designer Virgil Exner and incorporated on many cars such as the luxury 1957 Imperial as well as mass-market models such as the 1959 Plymouth Belvedere and included on the compact Plymouth Valiant by 1960. Some critics described this bulging styling element on the trunk lid as a "toilet seat."

The Lincoln Continental Mark III in 1969 included a "bump" in its rear deck lid to vaguely substitute the original 1939 Lincoln Continental spare tire design. This distinctive rear design was continued on the Mark series, including the Mark VIII coupe that was produced through 1998.

Modern use

Contemporary examples of continental kits are sometimes found on old and newer customized automobiles including late-model Lincoln Continental cars that never included a factory design or option. It has become an accessory that typifies "the spirit" of the 1950s. After-market continental kits are available for customization of 200 different automobile models. Some after-market applications may not enhance the design of the car.

Continental kits and trunk lid add-on spare tire trim were also made popular by the garish pimpmobile era of the 1970s and featured in "Super Fly" movies. Continental kits and simulated spare tires were also featured in some of the transformations done on the Pimp My Ride show. 

Continental tires are known as 'fifth wheels' in hip hop slang. For example, in the Houston hip-hop culture, "slabs" feature a rear-mounted wheel that has been "cut in half and enclosed in a fiberglass casing."

Numerous compact sport utility vehicle (SUV) models include an external rear-mounted spare tire from the factory. Accessory spare tire mounts that fit into a car's tow hitch are also available. Recreational vehicles may also have a spare tire on the rear. The wheel and tire combination may be exposed or covered with different materials that may have logos or other designs. These rear spare tire mounts are no longer described as a continental tire. Moreover, manufacturers have improved the packaging to mount spare tires under the car or cargo area floor. The externally rear-mounted tire appears on Jeep Wrangler and Mercedes-Benz G-Class vehicles to facilitate easy access when off-road.

See also 
Fender skirts
Whitewall tire
Spare wheel cover

References

External links

Automotive styling features
Automotive accessories
Tires
Vehicle modifications